Kerwin Peixoto Chiclayo (born 21 February 1988 in San Juan de Lurigancho) is a Peruvian footballer who plays as a defender for Chavelines Juniors.

Club career

International career
He has represented Peru at the U-17 and U-20 levels. Peixoto made his full international debut on November 19, 2009 in a friendly match against Honduras, which ended in a 2-1 win in favor of Peru.

References

External links

1988 births
Living people
Footballers from Lima
Association football defenders
Peruvian footballers
Club Alianza Lima footballers
Alianza Atlético footballers
Cobresol FBC footballers
Sport Boys footballers
Cienciano footballers
Peruvian people of Portuguese descent
Peru international footballers